Elizabeth Okie Paxton (1878–1972) was an American painter, married to another artist William McGregor Paxton (1869–1941). The Paxtons were part of the Boston School, a prominent group of artists known for works of beautiful interiors, landscapes, and portraits of their wealthy patrons. Her paintings were widely exhibited and sold well.

Early life
Elizabeth Vaughan Okie was born in Providence, Rhode Island, the daughter of Dr. Howard Okie (1846–1902) and Elizabeth Vaughn and had one sister Adele.

Education
Okie Paxton studied painting at the Cowles Art School, with Joseph DeCamp and Ernest Major. She also took instruction from William McGregor Paxton, who had been a student at Cowles, during his brief tenure teaching at the school.

Marriage
She was engaged in 1896 to William McGregor Paxton, one of her art instructors, and married him on January 3, 1899. Beginning in 1901, they traveled to Europe together. They often spent their summers on Cape Cod and Cape Ann, and lived in Newton, Massachusetts.

As a great beauty, she served as his muse before and during their marriage, modeling for many of his works, like the painting in which she was dressed for the ball. The couple had no children, instead focusing their creative energy on their work. Okie Paxton put her emphasis on her husband's career, managing it before and after his death at the expense of her career. She moved to Boston's Fenway Studios after her husband died.

William McGregor Paxton's papers—including sketches, correspondence, and photographs—are held at the Archives of American Art at the Smithsonian Institution in Washington, D.C. The papers include Okie Paxton's correspondence about her paintings, exhibitions, and sales of her husband's works. It also contains sketches of her by Paxton.

Career

Of the Bostonian women artists born in the 19th century, most came from families that provided sufficient financial means to open their own studios and pay for their education. Fortunately, Boston was a city that had a number of great teachers who would teach women, including her husband, William McGregor Paxton; Edmund C. Tarbell; Philip Hale; and William Morris Hunt. Education for women occurred in separate classes and at a higher cost than that for men. Women often went on to study in Europe. Generally women stuck to domestic and still life scenes. Many women married late, regardless of when they married, they often struggled with managing the traditional roles of wife and mother with their career as an artist. Okie Paxton, considered by one art critic to be a better painter than her husband, "painted ravishing still lifes of moments in time". But like Lilian Westcott Hale, who was also a talented artist married to an artist, her career was less important than that of her husband.

Okie Paxton utilized light, texture, and color like that of other artists of the Boston School. Her painting, Continental Breakfast, was shown at Rowland's in Boston and described on May 17, 1907,

The Breakfast Tray is a provocative bedroom scene. Rather than show pristine interiors typical of the Boston School, however, Okie Paxton depicted a sensual, messy environment, indicating a modern sensibility and sexuality of the occupants. Her work resembled Modernism, rather than the more traditional Boston School. Another modern bedroom scene was used in a Wamsutta sheet advertisement. Her work provided insight into a new emerging woman in the intimate details revealed in the painting:

By shifting from interior scenes to still life works, Okie Paxton avoided competing with her husband's subjects. Copper Jug with Apples is a still life of a table dressed with a white tablecloth upon which a copper-handled jug, three apples and a green cup and saucer. The painting was priced at $4,600 in 2011.

Exhibitions and collections

Okie Paxton exhibited at the Pennsylvania Academy of the Fine Arts, Philadelphia in 1916 and 1917. She showed in six Corcoran Gallery of Art biennials between 1912 and 1941 and ten exhibitions at the National Academy Museum and School. In 1913, she exhibited The Breakfast Tray, which was called a "dainty yet sound canvas", at the National Academy.

She also exhibited at the Panama–Pacific International Exposition in San Francisco in 1915 and won a silver medal for In the Morning. Okie Paxton exhibited at the 1939 New York World's Fair. She was awarded the Ann Vaughan Hyatt (later Anna Hyatt Huntington) gold medal at the American Artists Professional League, New York, and the National Gold Medal at the Council of American Artists' Societies, New York, 1964.

Her works are held in the collections of the Museum of Fine Arts, Boston; Maryhill Museum of Art, Goldendale, WA; and the Concord Art Association, Concord, MA. Because her works sold quickly to private collectors when exhibited, she is not well represented in public collections.

Legacy
 On an April 25, 1943, broadcast, Barbara Walker said of Okie Paxton's work:

 Her work, The Breakfast Tray,—along with that of William Merritt Chase, Alice Neel, John Singleton Copley and Roy Lichtenstein— appears in Art and Appetite: American Painting, Culture, and Cuisine, edited by Judith A. Barter.
 Okie Paxton's work was represented in a 2001 exhibition of women artists at the Boston Museum of Fine Arts entitled "A Studio of Her Own:Women Artists in Boston 1870–1940". The works of Polly Thayer, Gertrude Fiske, Gretchen Rogers, Lilian Westcott Hale, and Ellen Day Hale were shown. Three of Paxton's works were exhibited: The Breakfast Tray; The Open Window (1922), reminiscent of Johannes Vermeer; and the subtly hued Breakfast Still Life.

Notes

References

Further reading
 
 
 
 
 
 

1878 births
1972 deaths
Artists from Providence, Rhode Island
American women painters
20th-century American painters
20th-century American women artists
Boston School (painting)